Aliye is a Turkish and Iranian feminine given name. People named Aliye include:

Given name
 Aliye Berger (1903–1974), Turkish artist, engraver, and painter
 Aliye Rona (1921–1996), Turkish film actress
  (born 1951), Turkish Theater, cinema and TV series actor, voice actor, director

Middle name
 Fatma Aliye Topuz (1862–1936), Turkish novelist and women's rights activist
 Selma Aliye Kavaf (born 1962), Turkish politician

See also
 Aliya, given name
 Ali (name)

Turkish feminine given names